Paul Joseph Arizin (April 9, 1928 – December 12, 2006), nicknamed "'Pitchin Paul", was an American basketball player who spent his entire National Basketball Association (NBA) career with the Philadelphia Warriors from 1950 to 1962. He retired with the third highest career point total (16,266) in NBA history, and was named to the NBA's 25th, 50th and 75th anniversary teams. He was a high-scoring forward at Villanova University before being drafted by the Warriors of the fledgling NBA.

Biography
Born in Philadelphia to French immigrants, Arizin did not play basketball at La Salle College High School, failing to make the team in his only tryout as a senior. Arizin graduated just a year before another Basketball Hall of Famer, Tom Gola, entered La Salle College High School as a freshman.

During his freshman year at Villanova, Arizin played CYO (Catholic Youth Organization) basketball in Philadelphia. Late in that season, Al Severance, then the Villanova varsity basketball coach, attended one of Arizin's CYO games. Afterwards, Severance approached Arizin and asked him if he would like to go to Villanova, to which Arizin answered: "I already go to Villanova."

Arizin made the team in 1947, his sophomore year, and played for three years. In 1950 he was named the collegiate basketball player of the year after leading the nation with 25.3 points per game. Arizin also scored at least 100 points in a game while playing for Villanova, but the game is not recognized by the NCAA because the opponent was a junior college.

Professional career

Philadelphia Warriors (1950–1962) 
After being selected by the Warriors with their first pick in the 1950 NBA draft, Arizin averaged 17.2 points per game in his rookie season and was named NBA Rookie of the Year — a designation not currently sanctioned by the NBA for the 1950–51 season. He became one of the greatest NBA players of the 1950s, leading the league in scoring during the 1951–52 and 1956–57 seasons and leading in field goal percentage in 1951–52. Arizin sat out the 1952–53 and 1953–54 NBA seasons while serving in the Marines during the Korean War.

Arizin became famous for his line-drive jump shots, and teamed with center Neil Johnston to form the best offensive one-two punch in the NBA at the time, leading the Warriors to the 1956 NBA title. He also played with scoring star Joe Fulks early in his career, and with Philadelphia legends Tom Gola and Wilt Chamberlain toward the end of his career in the early 1960s. Arizin chose to retire from the NBA rather than move with the Warriors to San Francisco. At the time of his retirement, no player had retired from the game with a higher scoring average (21.9 points per game) in his final season. This record would stand until Bob Pettit's retirement in 1965 following a season in which he averaged 22.5 PPG.

Arizin played in a total of 10 NBA All-Star Games (he was the 1952 NBA All-Star Game MVP) and was named to the All-NBA First-Team in 1952, 1956, and 1957.

Camden Bullets (1962–1965) 
After retiring from the NBA, Arizin played for three seasons with the Camden Bullets of the Eastern Professional Basketball League, who won the 1964 title. Averaging over 20 points per game each season, he was named the EBL MVP in 1963, was named to the EBL All-Star First Team in 1963 and 1964 and to the EBL All-Star Second Team in 1965.

Legacy 
Arizin was named to the NBA 25th Anniversary Team in 1971. He was inducted into the Naismith Memorial Basketball Hall of Fame in 1978, and was selected to the 50 Greatest Players in NBA History in 1996. In October 2021, Arizin was honored as one of the league's greatest players of all time by being named to the NBA's 75th Anniversary Team. He was inducted into the inaugural class of the Philadelphia Sports Hall of Fame in 2004. Arizin died in his sleep at age 78 on December 12, 2006, in Springfield, Pennsylvania.

NBA career statistics

Regular season

Playoffs

See also

List of individual National Basketball Association scoring leaders by season
List of National Basketball Association career free throw scoring leaders
List of basketball players who have scored 100 points in a single game
List of NCAA Division I men's basketball players with 60 or more points in a game
List of NCAA Division I men's basketball season scoring leaders
List of National Basketball Association annual minutes leaders
Naismith Memorial Basketball Hall of Fame
List of NBA players who have spent their entire career with one franchise

References

External links
Basketball Hall of Fame profile
Extensive audio interview on Paul Arizin with his son Michael; from 6:50 mark 

1928 births
2006 deaths
All-American college men's basketball players
American men's basketball players
American people of French descent
Basketball players from Philadelphia
Naismith Memorial Basketball Hall of Fame inductees
National Basketball Association All-Stars
National Collegiate Basketball Hall of Fame inductees
Philadelphia Warriors draft picks
Philadelphia Warriors players
Shooting guards
Small forwards
United States Marines
Villanova Wildcats men's basketball players
United States Marine Corps personnel of the Korean War